= Ignatienne Nyirarukundo =

Rwandan politician

Ignatienne Nyirarukundo is a Rwandan politician who currently serves as Senior Advisor in Charge of Social Protection Program in the Office of Prime Minister since November 2021.

== Career ==
Prior to her appointment she was served as Minister of States in Charge of Social Affairs at Ministry of Local Government of Rwanda since 2019, before that she was Member of the Lower house of Parliament of Rwanda for six years.
